Ludomir Karol Goździkiewicz (13 March 1935 – 10 March 2014) was a Polish politician from the Polish People's Party. He served as member of the Sejm from 1989 to 1991.

References

1935 births
2014 deaths
People from Łowicz
People from Warsaw Voivodeship (1919–1939)
United People's Party (Poland) politicians
Polish People's Party politicians
Members of the Contract Sejm
Knights of the Order of Polonia Restituta
Recipients of the Cross of Merit (Poland)